Lemoine H. Batson (August 6, 1898 in Eau Claire, Wisconsin – January 30, 1991 in Hinsdale, Illinois) was a ski jumper from the United States in the ski jumping competition at the 1924 Winter Olympics in Chamonix. He was later selected for the 1932 Winter Olympics in Lake Placid, but did not compete.

Olympic results

References

1898 births
1991 deaths
American male ski jumpers
Sportspeople from Eau Claire, Wisconsin
Olympic ski jumpers of the United States
Ski jumpers at the 1924 Winter Olympics